Valentina de Angelis (born June 12, 1989) is an American actress. She is perhaps best known for her role as Young Bo in the 2003 film Off the Map, her first major acting role. In 2009, she had a recurring role as Carmen Fortier in the series Gossip Girl. The following year, she appeared in the soap opera As the World Turns as Faith Snyder.

Life and career
Born in Manhattan, de Angelis began her professional career as a child model. She is an alum of Professional Children's School.

In 2003, de Angelis had her first major acting role as Young Bo in the Campbell Scott-directed film Off the Map co-starring with Sam Elliott and Joan Allen.

She has had number of acting roles in television series filmed in New York City area. Those series include Love Monkey, Law & Order, CSI: NY, Blue Bloods and Person of Interest. Along with having recurring roles in Gossip Girl and As the World Turns in 2009 and 2010, respectively. In 2009, she made a guest appearance in CSI: Crime Scene Investigation.

Her other film credits include Bereavement, Camp Hope (also known as Camp Hell) and It's Kind of a Funny Story. All of which were released in 2010.

She also appeared in the role of Jenna in the film The Midnight Game which was released on August 12, 2014 by Anchor Bay Entertainment.

Filmography

References

External links

1989 births
21st-century American actresses
Actresses from New York City
American child actresses
American child models
Female models from New York (state)
American film actresses
American soap opera actresses
American television actresses
Living people
People from Manhattan
Models from New York City